Jeffrey Sinclair is a character in the fictional universe of the science fiction television series Babylon 5, played by actor Michael O'Hare. He was a regular in the first season of the show, as Commander of the Babylon 5 station, and made a number of guest appearances afterwards.

Role in Babylon 5

Character arc

The character's backstory is given as having been born on Mars Colony. In an early episode of season one, Sinclair states that his family had been pilots "ever since the Battle of Britain" and Sinclair's father was a fighter pilot for EarthForce who participated in the Battle of Balos, the last engagement of the Dilgar Invasion. Sinclair continued the tradition and became a fighter pilot. Sinclair enlisted in EarthForce in 2237. During his time at EarthForce Academy, he met Catherine Sakai, with whom he had a relationship. After a year of living together, the two of them broke up; however, they continued to see each other off and on through 2258, later getting engaged. Sakai went missing in late 2259, while on a mission for the Rangers. The season one episode "By Any Means Necessary" establishes that Sinclair received Jesuit education as a young man.

In 2240, Sinclair was promoted to fighter pilot, continuing a Sinclair family tradition that had extended as far back as the Battle of Britain. Less than a year later, Sinclair was promoted to squadron leader; due to his rapid rise through the ranks, the rumor of the day was that Sinclair was on the fast track to making Admiral. As squadron leader, Sinclair fought at the Battle of the Line, the last major battle in the Earth-Minbari War. During the course of the battle, his squadron was destroyed by the Minbari, and his fighter was badly damaged. In a last act of defiance, Sinclair attempted to ram one of the Minbari cruisers. He failed in this when he was captured by another Minbari cruiser for interrogation by the Grey Council. The Council's Triluminary detected Valen's DNA in Sinclair, so they assumed, to their profound shock, that he possessed the soul of Valen, a hero of the Minbari who led them to victory 1,000 years ago against the Shadows. It was concluded by the Grey Council that Minbari souls were being born into human bodies. The discovery of what Sinclair possessed led the Minbari to surrender and return Sinclair to his fighter, the memory of his time aboard the Minbari cruiser blocked (though this block would not be permanent and would break down years later). Sinclair — and the Earth Alliance — believed that he had blacked out from the acceleration. When Babylon 5 was brought into operation in 2257, Sinclair was selected by the Minbari to command the newly constructed station. He was selected over many more senior officers, including Colonel Ari Ben Zayn, all of whom had been vetoed by the Minbari (they had stipulated that they should approve the choice of Station Commander, as they had shared the cost of construction). 

In January 2259, Sinclair was reassigned as ambassador to Minbar, where he took command of the Rangers. He was succeeded at Babylon 5 by Captain John Sheridan. In 2260, Sinclair received a 900-year old letter from himself on Minbar, revealing that he was not the reincarnation of Valen, as the Grey Council believed, but in fact Valen himself. Armed with this knowledge, Sinclair took Babylon 4 back with him 1,000 years to aid the Minbari in their first war against the Shadows, and in so doing, fulfilled Minbari prophecy by becoming the One Who Was. It was here that Sinclair used the triluminary to transform himself into a Minbari, thus fulfilling the legend about Valen being "a Minbari not born of Minbari", also explaining why the triluminary responded so strongly to him during his interrogation by the Grey Council, as it had been programmed to respond to his DNA.

Characterization 

The character of Jeffrey Sinclair has been subject to several literary analysis, for example as a hero and as a leader.

Conceptual history 

After one full season, due to health issues, O'Hare and series executive producer/creator J. Michael Straczynski made the mutual and amicable decision for the character and actor to depart as a regular. O'Hare subsequently reprised the character of Sinclair briefly in season two and a two-episode guest appearance in season three, enabling the show to wrap up loose ends. As a result of this departure, there are several minor inconsistencies between the first season and the remainder of the show, most visibly in "And the Sky Full of Stars" and "Babylon Squared". At O'Hare's personal request, the full reasons for his departure from the show were kept secret until after his death in 2012. The following year, Straczynski revealed that O'Hare struggled with delusions and paranoia due to mental illness, which ultimately prevented him from continuing to act. However, Straczynski emphasized that O'Hare's fans, particularly those of his role as Sinclair, had helped him cope with his struggle in ways medication never could.

Reception

External links
 Jeffrey Sinclair at The Lurker's Guide to Babylon 5

References

Babylon 5 characters
Fictional commanders
Television characters introduced in 1993

ru:Список персонажей телесериала «Вавилон-5»#Джеффри Синклер